The 36th Cavalry Division was formed prior to 1939 and was assigned to the Belorussian Military District at the onset of Operation Barbarossa.

Wartime Service

Soviet invasion of Poland
Assigned to the 11th Army's 3rd Cavalry Corps for the invasion of Poland.

1941
The division was located in Vawkavysk, Belarus. This placed it in a position to be attacked by the Germans during the opening hours of the next phase.  On 22 June the division was ordered to form part of an Operations Group with the 6th Mechanized Corps to counterattack against the German forces.  It was attacked on 23 June by the Luftwaffe causing severe casualties among the troops and horses.  The division was effectively destroyed within 48 hours of the invasion and was officially disbanded on 6 July 1941.

Subordinate Units
24th Cavalry Regiment
42nd Cavalry Regiment
102nd Cavalry Regiment
8th Tank Regiment (54 tanks and 3 armored cars)

See also
 Cavalry Divisions of the Soviet Union 1917–1945

References

036
Military units and formations disestablished in 1938
Military units and formations of the Soviet invasion of Poland
Cavalry divisions of the Soviet Union in World War II